Acacia loderi, known colloquially as nelia or nealie, is a species of Acacia native to Australia.

Joseph Maiden described Acacia loderi in 1920 and it still bears its original name. It was named after its collector, assistant forester at Broken Hill A.C. Loder who collected it at Yancowinnia near Broken Hill in November 1907. The common name nelia and its former variants nealie and neelya are derived from the Ngiyambaa word  for the species.

The bark is grey. Like all wattles it has leaf-like structures known as phyllodes instead of leaves. The bright yellow flowers appear in spring (August to October).

Acacia loderi is found in inland southeastern Australia, mainly in far western New South Wales, from White Cliffs in the north of the tip of northwestern Victoria in the south, east to Hillston and west through the Darling River basin and Broken Hill into eastern South Australia, growing in colonized brown or red soils in mostly flat country. It forms a dominant component of Acacia loderi shrubland, where it is found with such trees as black oak (Casuarina pauper), inland rosewood (Alectryon oleifolius) and leopardwood  (Flindersia maculosa), and an understory of chenopods and grasses.

Acacia loderi shrubland has been classified as an Endangered Ecological Community by the New South Wales Government. Key threats include clearing and excessive grazing by livestock.

The Wiradjuri people of New South Wales use the seeds of the species to make flour for bread, the fibrous bark for making string and rope, and the resin is eaten and can be used to make glue.

References

loderi
Fabales of Australia
Plants described in 1920
Flora of New South Wales
Flora of South Australia
Flora of Victoria (Australia)